Edward Jobson (February 29, 1860 – February 7, 1925) was an American actor of stage and silent film. He started in silent films in his fifties. He had a sour yet sad bulldog demeanor and can be spotted in several surviving silent films. In The Delicious Little Devil (1919) he plays Rudolph Valentino's father, though the two actors looked nothing alike. He died at the beginning of 1925.

Filmography

References

External links

Still of Edward Jobson and Rudolph Valentino from The Delicious Little Devil (1919)

1860 births
1925 deaths
Male actors from Philadelphia
American male silent film actors
20th-century American male actors